Gan Ji (died 200), rendered also as Yu Ji, was a Taoist priest who lived during the late Eastern Han dynasty of China. As a Taoist clergy, Gan Ji helped to cure the diseases of many people and saving lives. He was widely respected in Wu County and Kuaiji, this caused Sun Ce to be jealous of his fame and reputation among the people. He was eventually executed by Sun Ce under the pretext of confusing the people's heart.

Life
Gan Ji was from Langya Commandery (琅琊郡, present-day southeastern Shandong). He first lived in the East before travelling to Wu County and Kuaiji. When he lived there, he helped with the harvest, burned incense, read Taoist books and made talismans to treat diseases of the common people. Among the populace of Wu and Kuaiji, many were his disciples. Once, Sun Ce gathered his officers and officials at the top of the prefecture's tower while Gan Ji walked below the tower in a splendid attire and carrying a small case in his hand. Around two-thirds of Sun Ce's retainers left the meeting to pay their respect to Gan Ji; those in charge of the meeting couldn't stop them. Because of this incident, Sun Ce was furious and arrested Gan Ji.

Those that served under Gan Ji sent their wives to plead with Sun Ce's mother to have him saved. Lady Wu (wife of Sun Jian) told Sun Ce "Master Yu assists the army and provide good fortune, heal and save the officers and soldiers; do not kill him." However Sun Ce answered "This man is a sorcerer who can deceive and confuse the many, because of him the officers stopped caring for the rules between a sovereign and his ministers. Going as far as to ignore me to pay their respect to him. He must be killed."

When Sun Ce's officers heard of this, they sent letters to explain the situation and pleaded to save his life. Sun Ce told them "During ancient times, Zhang Jin was the governor of Jiao's Province yet he abandoned the common teaching, abolished the ancestral customs and laws so he could promote the Dao's evil precepts proclaiming it was to help others yet in the end he was killed by the southerners. This is the just result of his actions, all of you do not understand this. Now Yu Ji is already a dead man, don't waste paper and brush for this."

Finally, Sun Ce beheaded Gan Ji and had his head hung in the market. However, those who served under Gan Ji wouldn't believe that he was dead, only that his soul left his body and would continue to offer sacrifices and promote fortune.

According to the Book of Later Han, during the reign of Emperor Shun of Han ( 125–144), Gong Chong (宮崇), one of Gan Ji's disciples, submitted the Taiping Qingling Shu (太平清領書) to the emperor; although there is no certitude that this is the same Gan Ji.

In Romance of the Three Kingdoms
Some believe that the character Yu Ji (于吉) in the 14th-century historical novel Romance of the Three Kingdoms is a misspelling of Gan Ji. In the novel, Yu Ji wandered around the Jiangdong region, chatting with soldiers and civilians, making everyone believe that he was a magician and healer. The warlord of Jiangdong, Sun Ce, heard of Yu Ji's magic and grew suspicious of him, thinking that he was casting spells on people. Sun Ce accused Yu Ji of sorcery and had him executed after Yu Ji stated that he cured people of diseases for free. However, Yu Ji's spirit returned to haunt Sun Ce and eventually caused him to die from shock.

In popular culture
In the video games Dynasty Warriors 5 and 7, there is a stage based on Sun Ce's confrontation with Yu Ji, a fictional event. In the stage Sun Ce has to fight Yu Ji clones, as well as a Da Qiao and Sun Jian clone.

The 1983 Hong Kong film The Weird Man by the Shaw Brothers Studio is loosely based on the story of Yu Ji and Sun Ce. Yu Ji was put to death by Sun Ce and he later comes back as a ghost and wreaks havoc on Sun Ce for revenge by possessing his army and his wife. He also helped Sun Ce kill Xu Gong while killing Sun Ce in the process. In this film, he is seen as the hero while Sun Ce is portrayed as the anti-hero. The Weird Man was remade in 1993 as Ninja in Ancient China which also combined some concepts from another Shaw Brothers movie the Five Elements Ninjas.

A fictionalized version of Yu Ji appears as the central antagonist in the 2023 video game Wo Long: Fallen Dynasty.

See also
 Taipingjing
 List of Taoists
 Lists of people of the Three Kingdoms

References

 Chen, Shou (3rd century). Records of the Three Kingdoms (Sanguozhi).
 Fan, Ye (5th century). Book of the Later Han (Houhanshu).
 Luo, Guanzhong (14th century). Romance of the Three Kingdoms (Sanguo Yanyi).
 Pei, Songzhi (5th century). Annotations to Records of the Three Kingdoms (Sanguozhi zhu).

2nd-century births
200 deaths
People during the end of the Han dynasty
Han dynasty Taoists
Chinese spiritual writers
Han dynasty writers
Taoist immortals